The George Institute for Global Health, is an independent medical research institute headquartered in Australia with offices in China, India and the United Kingdom. The George Institute conducts research on non-communicable disease, including heart and kidney disease, stroke, diabetes, and injury. The institute is known for conducting large-scale clinical studies. Between 1999 and 2017, the George has consumed over 750 million in research grant and fundraising.

The institute was founded by Stephen MacMahon and Robyn Norton, the George is affiliated with the universities of New South Wales, Peking, and Imperial College; having previously been affiliated with The University of Sydney between 1999 and 2017.

Notable researchers who were among the top 2% of those cited globally in 2019 are Simone Pettigrew, Meg Jardine, Pallab K Maulik and Soumyadeep Bhaumik.

References

External links
 The George Institute Official site
 George Clinical (Subsidiary) Official site

Medical and health organisations based in Australia
Medical research institutes in Sydney
International medical and health organizations
Contract research organizations
Public health organizations
Organisations based in Sydney
Sydney Medical School
1999 establishments in Australia
Research institutes established in 1999